Josef Hušek (born 27 January 1913, date of death unknown) was a Czech middle-distance runner. He competed in the men's 3000 metres steeplechase at the 1936 Summer Olympics.

References

1913 births
Year of death missing
Athletes (track and field) at the 1936 Summer Olympics
Czech male middle-distance runners
Czech male steeplechase runners
Olympic athletes of Czechoslovakia
Place of birth missing